Ranasinghe Premadasa (1924–1993) was the third President of Sri Lanka from 1989 to 1993.

Ranasinghe, a Sinhalese patronymic and surname, may also refer to:

Ajantha Ranasinghe (1940–2016), Sri Lankan journalist, lyricist, poet, and novelist
Anne Ranasinghe (1925–2016), Sri Lankan English-language poet
Anura Ranasinghe (1956–1998), Sri Lankan cricketer
Arthur Ranasinghe (1898–1976), Sri Lankan civil servant and statesman
Ashan Ranasinghe (born 1992), Sri Lankan cricketer
Dhanushka Ranasinghe (born 1992), Sri Lankan cricketer
Douglas Ranasinghe (born 1945), Sri Lankan actor
Hemal Ranasinghe (born 1984), Sri Lankan actor
Kavindu Ranasinghe (born 2001), Sri Lankan cricketer
Keerthi Ranasinghe (born 1962), Sri Lankan cricketer
Laddie Ranasinghe (1913–1983), Sri Lankan actor
Lionel Ranasinghe (born 1962), Sri Lankan assassin of Vijaya Kumaratunga
Nalinda Ranasinghe (born 1989), Sri Lankan cricketer
Oliver Ranasinghe, former Commander of the Sri Lankan Air Force
Oshadi Ranasinghe (born 1986), Sri Lankan cricketer
Parinda Ranasinghe, Sri Lankan judge and former Chief Justice of the Supreme Court of Ceylon
Piyadasa Ranasinghe (1946–1989), Sri Lankan political activist
Roshan Ranasinghe (born 1975), Sri Lankan politician
Sakvithi Ranasinghe, Sri Lankan English teacher
Sirimevan Ranasinghe, Sri Lankan admiral and former Commander of the Sri Lanka Navy
Sumeda Ranasinghe (born 1991), Sri Lankan javelin thrower
Sunethra Ranasinghe, Sri Lankan politician
Thiwanka Ranasinghe (born 1992), Sri Lankan boxer
Tissa Ranasinghe (1925–2019), Sri Lankan sculptor
Tony Ranasinghe (1937–2015), Sri Lankan actor
Udara Ranasinghe (born 1992), Sri Lankan cricketer

Patronymic surnames
Sinhalese surnames